Percy White (26 June 1868 – 19 October 1946) was a New Zealand cricketer. He played two first-class matches for Auckland between 1906 and 1908.

White made his first-class debut at the age of 38 for Auckland against the touring MCC side in December 1906. A last-minute replacement for an unavailable player, he took 6 for 21 in the first innings, varying his pace and length and deceiving the batsmen with his flight. However, he played only once more.

See also
 List of Auckland representative cricketers

References

External links
 

1868 births
1946 deaths
New Zealand cricketers
Auckland cricketers
Cricketers from Auckland